Ginger and Cinnamon or Dillo con parole mie  is a 2003  Italian comedy film directed by  Daniele Luchetti. It was filmed in Greece, on the  Ios Island.

Plot

While vacationing on the Greek Isle of Love, a repressed 30-year-old Stefania reluctantly plays chaperon to her precocious and sometimes annoying 14-year-old niece, Meggy, who plans to lose her virginity before the summer is over. Unbeknownst to Stefania, Meggy's chosen man is in fact Stefania's ex-boyfriend. Amidst a mélange of sun rash, broken diets, nervous girls, sleeping bags, orgasms, '80s music, and a little ginger and cinnamon, the two women discover themselves and their sexuality.

External links 
 
 Press Book from Film movement http://www.filmmovement.com/downloads/press/GCPressKit.pdf

2003 films
2003 comedy films
Commedia all'italiana
2000s Italian-language films
Films directed by Daniele Luchetti
Italian comedy films